Leg Branch (also spelled Legg Branch) is a stream in Lewis County in the U.S. state of Missouri. It is a tributary of Derrahs Branch.

Leg Branch derives its name from Billy and J. L. Legg, pioneer settlers.

See also
List of rivers of Missouri

References

Rivers of Lewis County, Missouri
Rivers of Missouri